Angelo Barletta (born 11 February 1977) is a German former professional footballer and manager. He currently manages Bayern Alzenau.

Career 
Barletta was born in Hanau. He has played most of his football in the second division of the Bundesliga, having previously played for Sportfreunde Siegen, Rot-Weiß Erfurt, Kickers Offenbach, and SG Hoechst.

From 2019 to 2020 he was the manager of Kickers Offenbach.

References

1977 births
Living people
Association football midfielders
Italian footballers
German footballers
German people of Italian descent
Kickers Offenbach players
FC Rot-Weiß Erfurt players
Sportfreunde Siegen players
Panserraikos F.C. players
FSV Frankfurt players
VfL Osnabrück players
TuS Koblenz players
2. Bundesliga players
3. Liga players
Expatriate footballers in Greece
German football managers
Italian football managers
Kickers Offenbach managers
FSV Frankfurt managers
Sportspeople from Hanau
Footballers from Hesse